Mount Harris, also named Boundary Peak 156, is a mountain in Alaska and British Columbia, located on the Canada–United States border in the Takhinsha Mountains. In 1923 Boundary Peak 156 was named Mount Harris in honour of D. R. Harris, a surveyor in the Canadian section of the Boundary Survey.

See also
List of Boundary Peaks of the Alaska-British Columbia/Yukon border

References

Harris, Mount
Mountains of Haines Borough, Alaska
Harris, Mount
Harris, Mount
Canada–United States border
International mountains of North America